Oberonia titania, commonly known as the soldier's crest orchid or red-flowered king of the fairies, is a plant in the orchid family and is a clump-forming epiphyte. It has between four and ten leaves in a fan-like arrangement on each shoot and up to 350 tiny pinkish to red flowers arranged in whorls around the flowering stem. It is found in Java, New Caledonia and eastern Australia including Norfolk Island.

Description
Oberonia titania is an epiphytic, clump-forming herb. Flowering occurs between January and June.

Taxonomy and naming
Oberonia titania was first formally described in 1859 by John Lindley who published the description in Folia Orchidaceae.

Distribution and habitat
The soldier's crest orchid grows on trees in rainforest and moist gullies in Java, New Caledonia, New South Wales including Norfolk Island and in Queensland.

Conservation
This orchid is classed as "vulnerable" under the New South Wales Government Biodiversity Conservation Act 2016. The main threats to the species are habitat degradation and loss, and illegal collecting.

References

External links

Photo of a flower raceme

titania
Orchids of Oceania
Orchids of New Caledonia
Orchids of Indonesia
Orchids of Java
Orchids of Queensland
Orchids of New South Wales
Flora of Norfolk Island
Plants described in 1859